What is Love? is a 1992 cabaret album by Andrea Marcovicci. It was issued as part of a Cabaret series by DRG Records. Marcovicci is accompanied by Glenn Mehrback at the piano.

Track listing
What Is Love? includes the following tracks.

References

1991 albums